Rhapsa suscitatalis, the wedged rhapsa, is a moth of the family Noctuidae first described by Francis Walker in 1859. It is found in Australia in New South Wales, the Australian Capital Territory, Victoria, Tasmania and South Australia.

References

Catocalinae